James or Jim Dickson may refer to:

Politicians
James Dickson (Scottish politician) (c. 1715–1771), MP for Lanark Burghs 1768–1771
James Dickson (New South Wales politician) (1813–1863), member of the New South Wales Legislative Assembly
James Dickson (Queensland politician) (1832–1901), Australian politician and 13th Premier of Queensland
James Dickson (Irish politician) (1850–1941), Liberal MP for Dungannon 1880–1885
James Dickson (New Zealand politician) (1854–1937), Reform Party member
James Dickson (Swedish politician) (1899–1980), MP for The Right 1941–1968
James Hill Dickson (1863–1938), Northern Ireland politician
James Samuel Dickson (1870–1939), New Zealand politician
Jim Dickson (politician) (born 1964), English politician

Sport
James Sinclair Dickson (1885–1961), Australian rules footballer
James Dickson (cricketer) (1887–1970), New Zealand cricketer
Jim Dickson (baseball) (born 1938), pitcher for the Houston Colt .45s, Cincinnati Reds, and Kansas City Athletics

Others
James Dickson (botanist) (1738–1822), Scottish botanist
James Dickson (merchant) (1784–1855), Scottish merchant and philanthropist in Gothenburg, Sweden
James Bell Dickson (1923–1944), pilot in the U.S. Army Air Forces
James G. Dickson (1891–1962), American mycologist
James Jameson Dickson (1815–1885), Scottish Swedish logging industrialist and philanthropist
James Robertson Dickson (1810–1873), Swedish shipping and logging businessman
James Dickson (musician), member of New Zealand pop group The Chills
Jim Dickson (producer) (1931–2011), American record producer
James Dickson was the name of one of the people killed during the 1990 Aramoana massacre

See also
James Dickson Phillips Jr. (1922–2017), American judge
James Dixon (disambiguation)